Coughlin (or,   according to the cases,)  is a surname of Irish origin ( or ), meaning 'son of the one with the cloak'. Notable people with the surname include:

Bill Coughlin (1878–1943), American baseball player
Father Charles Coughlin (1891–1979), radio political commentator of the 1930s
Carter Coughlin (born 1997), American football player
Con Coughlin (born 1955), British journalist
Daniel Coughlin (born 1934), Chaplain of the US House of Representatives 2000–2011
Daniel P. Coughlin (author), American writer
Ed Coughlin (1861–1952), American baseball player
Edward J. Coughlin (1885–1945), New York politician
Jack Coughlin (disambiguation), several people
John Coughlin (disambiguation), several people
Lawrence Coughlin (1929–2001), US Congressman from Pennsylvania
Natalie Coughlin (born 1982), American swimmer, Olympic gold medalist
Paul Coughlin (born 1992), English cricketer
Roscoe Coughlin (1868-1951), Major League Baseball player
Russell Coughlin (born 1960), Welsh footballer
Ryan Coughlin (born 1973), Canadian football player
Tom Coughlin (born 1946), head coach of the New York Giants
Tom Coughlin (Walmart) (born 1949), American business executive

References

See also
Coughlin Campanile at South Dakota State University
Hugh Coflin (1928–2021), Canadian ice hockey player
Coughlan
Coghlan (surname)